Warren Leroy Jones (July 2, 1895 – November 11, 1993) was a United States circuit judge of the United States Court of Appeals for the Fifth Circuit and the United States Court of Appeals for the Eleventh Circuit.

Education and career

Born in Gordon, Nebraska, Jones received a Bachelor of Laws from the University of Denver College of Law in 1924. He was a deputy district attorney of Denver County, Colorado from 1922 to 1924, and was in private practice in Denver, Colorado in 1925, and then in Jacksonville, Florida until 1955.

Federal judicial service

Jones was nominated by President Dwight D. Eisenhower on March 4, 1955, to a seat on the United States Court of Appeals for the Fifth Circuit vacated by Judge Louie Willard Strum. He was confirmed by the United States Senate on April 19, 1955, and received his commission on April 21, 1955. He assumed senior status on February 17, 1966. Jones was reassigned by operation of law to the United States Court of Appeals for the Eleventh Circuit on October 1, 1981, pursuant to 94 Stat. 1994. His service terminated on November 11, 1993, due to his death in Jacksonville.

References

Sources
 

1895 births
1993 deaths
Judges of the United States Court of Appeals for the Fifth Circuit
Judges of the United States Court of Appeals for the Eleventh Circuit
United States court of appeals judges appointed by Dwight D. Eisenhower
20th-century American judges
People from Gordon, Nebraska
People from Jacksonville, Florida
Sturm College of Law alumni
Lawyers from Denver
Florida lawyers